GPI transamidase component PIG-S is an enzyme that in humans is encoded by the PIGS gene.
This gene encodes a protein that is involved in GPI-anchor biosynthesis. 

The glycosylphosphatidylinositol (GPI) anchor is a glycolipid found on many blood cells and serves to anchor proteins to the cell surface. This gene encodes an essential component of the multisubunit enzyme, GPI transamidase. GPI transamidase mediates GPI anchoring in the endoplasmic reticulum, by catalyzing the transfer of fully assembled GPI units to proteins.

References

Further reading